The 1921 New Hampshire football team was an American football team that represented  New Hampshire College of Agriculture and the Mechanic Arts during the 1921 college football season—the school became the University of New Hampshire in 1923. In its sixth season under head coach William "Butch" Cowell, the team compiled an 8–1–1 record, only losing to Dartmouth, while outscoring their opponents by a total of 234 to 66.

Early in the season, the team played two "home" games in nearby Dover, New Hampshire. The first home game at Memorial Field, located in Durham, New Hampshire, was held in November; the field was used for home football games through the 1935 season.

Schedule

Although The Granite yearbook described the September 24 contest against USMC Portsmouth as a "practice game", the result is listed by College Football Data Warehouse and the Wildcats' media guide. A newspaper article about the next season's rematch noted that the USMC team was composed of Marine Corps personnel working at the Portsmouth Naval Prison in nearby Kittery, Maine.

The 1921 game was the first meeting between the New Hampshire and Army football programs. It was one of two contests the Cadets played on October 1; before losing to New Hampshire, Army defeated Springfield College that same day.

The Dartmouth game was attended by Governor of New Hampshire Fred H. Brown, a Dartmouth graduate. Following their 1921 game, New Hampshire and Holy Cross next met in 1973. New Hampshire's 56–7 win over Massachusetts remains the largest margin of victory in what later became known as the Colonial Clash rivalry. Other than 1943 and 1945, when New Hampshire did not field teams due to World War II, 1921 remains the most recent season without a New Hampshire–Maine game.

Team captain Dutch Connor was an inaugural member of the UNH Wildcats Hall of Fame in 1982.

Notes

References

Further reading
 

New Hampshire
New Hampshire Wildcats football seasons
New Hampshire football